Hobbs Ridge is a prominent arc-shaped ridge which circumscribes Hobbs Glacier to the north and northwest and forms the divide with the lower part of Blue Glacier, on the Scott Coast of Victoria Land, Antarctica. It was named in association with Hobbs Glacier. Projection Peak rises at its most southeastern point.

References

Ridges of Victoria Land
Scott Coast